The Ames Gate Lodge is a celebrated work by American architect H. H. Richardson. It is privately owned on an estate landscaped by Frederick Law Olmsted, but its north facade can be seen from the road at 135 Elm Street, North Easton, Massachusetts. In 2013, the Ames Gate Lodge was protected by a preservation easement held by Historic New England.

The lodge was designed and constructed in 1880-1881 for Frederick Lothrop Ames, son of railway magnate Oliver Ames, Jr., as the northern entrance to his Langwater estate. Although Langwater dated from 1859 with 1876 additions, its northern regions had until then remained unfinished. Ames thus engaged Richardson and Olmsted in collaboration on its creation. Olmsted's landscape designs were implemented in 1886-1887.

The Gate Lodge is a remarkable synthesis of oversize stone wall, arched gate, and gatehouse building, perhaps based in part on Richardson's appreciation of the Central Park bridges designed by Calvert Vaux. It forms a long, low mass lying directly athwart the estate's entry road, which runs southward within its dominating, semicircular arch. The massive walls appear to be crude heaps of rounded boulders from the estate soil -- "cyclopean rubble" in Vincent Scully's memorable phrase—trimmed in Longmeadow brownstone. The blocky, two-story lodge proper stands west of the arch, and originally housed the estate gardener on the lower floor with rooms for bachelor guests above. Across the arch is a long, low wing ending in a circular bay, once used for storing plants through the winter.

The lodge's public (northern) facade is relatively flat and austere; its southern facade, by contrast, is highly shaped with protrusions and a large porch featuring carvings by Augustus Saint-Gaudens. Capping all is the lodge's prominent, hipped, reddish-tiled roof with its eyelid dormers. As Frank Lloyd Wright once wrote, "The presence of a building is in its roof, and what a roof the Ames Gate Lodge has!"

It was later enlarged by Richardson's successors, Shepley, Rutan and Coolidge, and has subsequently been shingled and otherwise modified.

See also
H. H. Richardson Historic District of North Easton
North Easton Historic District
Historic New England
Frederick Lothrop Ames

References 
 Jeffrey Karl Ochsner, H. H. Richardson: Complete Architectural Works, MIT Press, 1985, page 46. .
 Francis R. Kowsky, "H. H. Richardson's Ames Gate Lodge and the Romantic Landscape Tradition", in The Journal of the Society of Architectural Historians, Vol. 50, No. 2 (Jun., 1991), pp. 181–188.
 Francis R. Kowsky online
 Vincent J. Scully, Jr., The Shingle Style and the Stick Style: architectural theory and design from Downing to the Origins of Wright, Yale University Press, 1971, page 92. .
 Linda Flint MacClelland, Building the National Parks: historic landscape design and construction, Johns Hopkins University Press, 1998, page 93. .
 Dell Upton, Architecture in the United States, Oxford University Press, 1998, page 96. .
 Great Buildings online
 ArchiPlanet

Richardsonian Romanesque architecture in Massachusetts
Henry Hobson Richardson buildings
Buildings and structures in Bristol County, Massachusetts
Historic district contributing properties in Massachusetts
National Register of Historic Places in Bristol County, Massachusetts
Butler–Ames family